Take It or Leave It is a 1981 film about the British ska/pop band Madness.

Plot
The genre of the film is between documentary, drama and comedy. The film begins in Camden Town, London, on a grey day in January 1976. Three friends, Lee Thompson, Chris Foreman and Mike Barson, start to play music together. Along the way their band suffers numerous arguments and changes in their line-up before finding success in the final scene, with a full piece Madness going out to a packed, screaming arena.

Production
Take It or Leave It was directed by the owner of Madness label Stiff Records, Dave Robinson, who also directed the band's music videos. The film's budget was paid by the members of Madness, with £20,000 each (£140,000) and £250,000 by Stiff.

Film from the first four days of the shoot was overexposed in the development lab which necessitated reshoots.

Soundtrack
The soundtrack contains live and studio recorded Madness songs from the band's first two albums, One Step Beyond... and Absolutely, various b-sides, covers, an early song never issued on record (Sunshine Voice), and several songs from their then new album entitled 7.

The film is available on DVD, with commentary by Dave Robinson and Madness guitarist Chrissy Boy.

The soundtrack album was not released until 2013.

Sources
Mojo Special Limited Edition, The Ska Explosion!, "Padded Cells" by Johnny Black.
Total Madness by George Marshall.

References

External links

Take It Or Leave It commentary write-up

1981 films
1981 comedy-drama films
British documentary films
British drama films
1980s English-language films
Madness (band)
1980s British films